Crni Kamen (Cyrillic: Црни Камен), meaning "black stone" in Serbo-Croatian and Macedonian, may refer to: 

Crni Kamen Peak, a peak of the Šar Mountains, located in Kosovo and North Macedonia
Crni Kamen River, a river in Kosovo, an affluent of the Radika river
Crni Kamen, near Selecka Planina and Prilep North Macedonia